Abdulla Bin Zaid Al Mahmoud Islamic Cultural Center  (commonly known simply as Bin Zaid, also known previously as Fanar or Qatar Islamic Culture Center and Spiral Mosque) is a cultural organization in Doha, the capital of Qatar. It is located close to  Doha Corniche and is a prominent landmark in the city.

The center's most distinguished feature is its mosque which has a unique minaret design. Prior to 2009, Fanar's mosque was the largest in the country. It has since been over taken in this category by Imam Muhammad ibn Abd al-Wahhab Mosque, however, it remains the tallest mosque in Qatar.

The mosque was named after the famous Qatari Islamic scholar and the founder of the Qatari judicial system Sheikh Abdulla bin Zaid Al-Mahmoud. The name was given by the Emir of Qatar to commemorate the memory of his achievements during his tenure as the supreme judge of Qatar.

History

Qatari Prime Minister Hamad bin Jassim bin Jaber Al Thani officially inaugurated the center during a public ceremony held on 12 January 2008.

Activities
Fanar Culture Center is involved in several social, religious and educational activities. In addition to hosting one of the largest mosques in Qatar, the center also publishes religious studies and provides lessons in Arabic and Islam. The center also houses a library. The mosque is a popular tourist attraction and allows entry for non-Muslims.

Mosque architecture
Traditional Qatari mosques were made of coral rock, mud and wood, as opposed to the mosques from the 21st century built of brick and mortar. These materials now allow the construction of high domes, replacing the flat roofs. Moreover, traditional mosques featured courtyards, which are rarely seen in modern mosques. Finally, the traditional outdoor "mothawaddah" in the form of a pool has been replaced with wash basins and running water.

References

External links

 Fanar Islamic Culture Centre & Mosque: Official homepage

Mosques in Doha
Cultural organisations based in Qatar
Islamic organisations based in Qatar